The 2019 Missouri Valley Conference women's soccer tournament was the postseason women's soccer tournament for the Missouri Valley Conference held from November 3 through November 10, 2019. The five match tournament took place at Allison South Stadium in Springfield, Missouri. The six-team single-elimination tournament consisted of three rounds based on seeding from regular season conference play. The defending champions were the Loyola Ramblers, who successfully defended their title by defeating  Illinois State 2–0 in the final.  The conference tournament title was the Second for the Loyloa women's soccer program and the second for head coach Barry Bimbi.

Bracket

Source:

Schedule

Opening Round

Semifinals

Final

Statistics

Goalscorers 
2 Goals
 Sienna Cruz (Loyola-Chicago)
 Katie Del Fava (Illinois State)
 Natalie Vaughn-Low (Illinois State)

1 Goal
 Unnur Bergsdottir (Missouri State)
 Olina Einarsdottir (Missouri State)
 Lindsey Hardiman (Loyola-Chicago)
 Kennady Orlick (Missouri State)
 Kayleigh Putnam (Missouri State)
 Cassie Rohan (Drake)

All-Tournament team

Source:

MVP in bold

References 

Missouri Valley Conference Women's Soccer Tournament
2019 Missouri Valley Conference women's soccer season